Oceania Tennis Federation (OTF) is the regional governing body of tennis in Oceania. It was formed as a regional association of International Tennis Federation in 1993 with seven member nations to foster the development of tennis in the Oceania region specially main focus on small island nations (territories/dependencies) and Papua New Guinea as the structure of tennis in both Australia and New Zealand was already well developed. The organisation started with seven members now have twenty one countries in its members list.

Member Nations

Oceania Tennis Federation has 20 full-time member nations and one New Caledonia associate member. This is an alphabetically ordered list of full members of OTF:

ANZ Schools plan
In 1994 OTF President Geoff Pollard initiated a program allowing more children to play tennis at school level; OTF player development and marketing consultant Barry McMillan reached to ANZ Banking Group with this scheme for financial support. ANZ group agreed to this deal to sponsor a tennis in schools program in Pacific Island nations.

See also
 Pacific Oceania Billie Jean King Cup team
 Pacific Oceania Davis Cup team

References

 
Tennis organizations
Sports governing bodies in Oceania
Sports organizations established in 1993
1993 establishments in Oceania